The Mazumders of Sylhet, or more specifically, the Mazumders of Gorduar/Barshala, are a notable aristocratic family who have played important roles throughout the history of the Sylhet region.

History

Origin
The family was founded by a Bengali Hindu man called Sarbananda from the village of Barsala. Sarbananda became a Muslim, changing his name to Sarwar, and worked as a minister under the Sultan of Bengal. Under the instructions of Sultan Alauddin Husain Shah, Sarwar went to the Pratapgarh Kingdom to negotiate with Sultan Muhammad Bazid to return Sylhet to the Bengal Sultanate. After being rejected by Bazid, Sarwar defeated him in a war also fighting Bazid's allies, the Zamindars of Kanihati and of Ita. Bazid gave up his title as the Sultan of Pratapgarh, and Sarwar was rewarded as the next legitimate Nawab of Sylhet after Gawhar Khan Aswari's death, and was granted the title of Khan.

Early history
Sarwar's son, Mir Khan was the next Nawab of Sylhet. Mir Khan, was made the Qanungoh (revenue officer) of Sylhet, and the family continued holding this office until the abolishment of the Qanungoh system. Mir Khan married Lavanyavati, the Muslim daughter of Bazid of Pratapgarh.

Lodi Khan was said to have won a battle against Khwaja Usman, and then his son Jahan Khan established Jahanpur, named after himself. In the 17th century, Keshwar Khan, the Qanungoh of Sylhet under Emperor Aurangzeb, dug a canal which he called Keshwar Khal. His son, Mahtab Khan, is also known to have established a Haat bazaar in the Sylhet region named after himself.

During British rule

Mahtab Khan's son was Masud Bakht who was made the Head Qanungoh of Sylhet. Masud played an important part in maintaining peace during the Muharram Rebellion of 1782. He was succeeded as Qanungoh by his nephew, Muhammad Bakht in 1793. Muhammad Bakht founded the village of Muhammadabad.

Ashraf Ali Majumdar (1817-1883) was a notable disciple of Karamat Ali Jaunpuri. In the late 17th century, Syed Bakht Majumdar and his family migrated to Makkah, under the Ottoman Empire, where he joined the council of the Sharif of Mecca and was awarded the Star of the Mejidhi. On the 1st of April 1867, Syed had a son called Muhammad. Following Syed's return to Sylhet, he and his son, Moulvi Hamid Bakht Majumdar, became one of the only people in their province to be exempted of civil court attendance. The family also established the Sayyidia Madrasa in Sylhet. Hamid was the Deputy Collector of Sylhet and assisted in the Lushai Hills expedition. Hamid was fluent in Persian and wrote the prose Ain-i-Hind, a history of the Indian subcontinent. Ala Bakhsh Majumdar Hamed was known to have written Tuhfatul Muhsineen and Diwan-i-Hamed. Collectively, the works of these two are regarded amongst the most creative literary works in the Sylhet region.

Hamid's younger brother, Majid Bakht Majumdar was made the Deputy Collector and Magistrate of Rajshahi in 1878. He then became the Assistant Commissioner of the Assam Province. He assisted the government in the battles of Lushai and Manipur. Majid was awarded the title of Khan Bahadur by King Edward VII for his efforts and invited to the King's coronation at the Delhi Durbar of 1903. The wrestler, Ashrab Ali Majumdar was also from this family.

In the early eighteenth century, Syed's other son (who was born in Makkah), Muhammad Bakht Majumdar, was made the Honorary Magistrate of Bengal and the Extra Assistant Commissioner in Assam. He was an important visitor of the Civil Jail and Leper Asylum in Sylhet and a member of the District's Local Board council. He is known to have established a madrasa in Sylhet as well. In 1857, he presented six pieces of military equipment to the British Raj. He had a keen interest in the tea industry and in 1904, he opened the Brahmanchara Tea Estate alongside Syed Abdul Majid, Ghulam Rabbani and Karim Bakhsh. He was given the title of Khan Bahadur in 1909. Muhammad was also one of the prominent leaders of the Sylhet-Bengal Reunion League formed in 1920 to reunite the Sylhet District with Bengal, which it had been separated from. However, in September 1928, Muhammad proposed a resolution, during the Surma Valley Muslim Conference, opposing the transfer of Sylhet and Cachar to Bengal and this even gained support from Syed Abdul Majid and his organisation Anjuman-e-Islamia, as well as the Muslim Students Association. His son was Maulvi Munawwar Bakht Majumdar, the father of H. A. Hamid Bakht Majumdar, the current mutawalli (guardian) of the Majumdari Estate.

See also
History of Sylhet

References

Mughal nobility
Asian noble families
Bangladeshi families
Bengali families
People from Sylhet